Ore Thooval Pakshikal is a 1988 Malayalam film written, directed and produced by Chintha Ravi. The film, in a docu-drama style, depicts the last days of the British Raj. It stars Balan K. Nair, Tom Alter, Nilambur Balan and Ramachandran Mokeri in pivotal roles. The film features an original score composed by legendary filmmaker G. Aravindan.

Awards
 Kerala State Film Awards
 Best Film- Chintha Ravi
 Second Best Actress- Kukku Parameswaran
 Best Music Director- G. Aravindan

References

External links
 
 Ore Thooval Pakshikal at the British Film Institute Movie Database
 Ore Thooval Pakshikal at the Malayalam Movie Database

1980s Malayalam-language films
Films set in the 1930s